Brian M. Wiseman (born July 13, 1971) is a Canadian former professional ice hockey forward and NHL assistant coach.

Biography
As a novice player, Wiseman scored 413 goals in a single season.  This broke a record held by Wayne Gretzky, and brought about national attention to the nine-year-old Wiseman. He played in the 1984 Quebec International Pee-Wee Hockey Tournament with a minor ice hockey team from Chatham.

Wiseman owns the only retired number of the former Chatham MicMacs (now named Jr. Maroons) of the former Western Ontario Hockey League. His number 9 was retired after he left Chatham to play for the University of Michigan Wolverines. Approximately 3,600 spectators were in attendance to see Wiseman break Ed Olczyk's single season point record. Wiseman amassed 147 points in just 40 games in 1989–90.

During his career at University of Michigan, he was named Freshman of the Year in 1991, had Frozen Four appearances in 1992 and 1993 and the Wolverines were CCHA Tournament Champions in 1994.  He finished his U-M career with 248 points including a school-record 164 assists.

In 1996, Wiseman faced trial for alleged sexual assault of a 15-year-old girl that occurred in 1991. He was acquitted.

He was drafted by the New York Rangers in the 12th round of the 1991 NHL Entry Draft after his freshman season, but remained at U-M to complete his stellar career.

Wiseman would next move to play hockey professionally.  He played for the Chicago Wolves (IHL), St. John's Maple Leafs (AHL), Toronto Maple Leafs (NHL), and Houston Aeros (IHL) before retiring due to concussion problems stemming from an injury suffered during the Aeros' 1999–2000 playoff season. He helped the Houston Aeros capture the Turner Cup in the 1998–1999 season and was named the IHL's Most Valuable Player in 1999 after leading the league in scoring with 109 points.

After his playing career, he spent one season as a video coach with the Dallas Stars and another as an assistant coach at Princeton University.  From 2012-2019, Wiseman was an assistant coach for varsity ice hockey at the University of Michigan.  Since 2019, he has been an assistant coach for the Edmonton Oilers.

In 2007, Wiseman was inducted into the Chatham (Ontario) Sports Hall of Fame.

On July 5, 2022 The New York Islanders announced that Doug Houda and Brian Wiseman have been brought on as assistant coaches under Lane Lambert.

On July 28, 2022 The New York Islanders announced that John MacLean would be joining the coaching staff of the Islanders for the 2022-2023 season and that Wiseman would not be on the staff. No reason was given for the change.

On August 19, 2022, Wiseman was named as an assistant coach for the San Jose Sharks.

Career statistics

Awards and honours

References

https://www.mlive.com/wolverines/2019/07/michigan-assistant-brian-wiseman-leaving-to-join-edmonton-oilers-staff.html?outputType=amp

External links

1971 births
Living people
Canadian ice hockey centres
Chicago Wolves players
Dallas Stars coaches
Edmonton Oilers coaches
Houston Aeros (1994–2013) players
Ice hockey people from Ontario
Michigan Wolverines men's ice hockey players
New York Rangers draft picks
St. John's Maple Leafs players
Sportspeople from Chatham-Kent
Toronto Maple Leafs players
Canadian ice hockey coaches
AHCA Division I men's ice hockey All-Americans